are traditional Japanese wrapping cloths traditionally used to wrap and/or to transport goods.

While they come in a variety of sizes, they are typically square. Traditional materials include silk or cotton, but modern  are available in synthetic materials like rayon, nylon, or polyester.

History 
By the Heian period, cloths called , meaning "flat wrap", were used to wrap clothes.

They became popular in the Edo period with increased access to bathhouses by the general public; moreover, cloths with family crests grew in demand as common people gained the right to have family crests during the Meiji period.

Modern  may be made from fabrics of various thicknesses and price points, including silk, cotton, rayon, and nylon.

 usage declined in the post-war period, in large part due the proliferation of paper and plastic bags available to shoppers. In recent years, however, it has seen a renewed interest as environmental protection has become a greater concern. In 2006, Japanese Minister of the Environment, Yuriko Koike, showcased a specially-designed  cloth to promote environmental awareness.

See also 
 , a type of Japanese textile used for gift-wrapping or for purifying equipment during a Japanese tea ceremony
 , a similar square cloth in Korea
 , a thin Japanese hand towel made of cotton

References

External links

 Some common furoshiki folding patterns
 Youtube: Kakefuda, Kyoto (Another tutorial videoclip).

Japanese culture
Textile arts of Japan
Japanese words and phrases